Kalateh-ye Zaman Sufi (also Romanized as Kalāteh-ye Zamān Şūfī; also known as Zamān Şūfī) is a village in Almeh Rural District, Samalqan District, Maneh and Samalqan County, North Khorasan Province, Iran. At the 2006 census, its population was 653, in 173 families.

References 

Populated places in Maneh and Samalqan County